The Americas Rugby Championship, often informally called the Americas' Six Nations, was an annual international rugby tournament between six North and South American nations: Argentina, Brazil, Canada, Chile, the United States and Uruguay. Originally competed by various interlocking combinations of club, second-tier national and top national sides,  the current (since 2016) international tournament has the top national sides competing (though Argentina, to date, sends its second-tier team). The current format provides these top national teams with additional test matches to be counted in the World Rugby Rankings.

The original Americas Rugby Championship (organised by World Rugby) was inaugurated in 2009, when varying combinations of national, regional and development teams from North and South America competed for the title. In 2015, it was announced that from 2016, the competition would re-form under the guidance of the Americas Rugby Association and the respective unions, to provide the six national sides with additional rankings tests annually. The updated format is based on the structure of the European Six Nations Championship, coinciding with each other in February and March of each year. Prior to this, the last competitive tournament to be held across the Sudamérica–RAN region had been the PARA Pan American Championship, which had ceased after its 2003 edition. World Rugby has granted all matches with test match status, with caps awarded for every match, though matches against the Argentina XV (rather than the top Argentina national squad) will not affect the World Rugby Rankings.

History

First conception
Originally formed in 2009 by World Rugby (then known as the International Rugby Board) to replace the North America 4 Series, was created to give the newly formed Canadian regions more competitive matches against strong opposition from the second teams of the United States and Argentina. The winner of the inaugural Canadian Rugby Championship, BC Bears, went on to compete on the international stage, playing the winner of the international semi-final match between USA Select XV and Argentina Jaguars. The Argentina Jaguars defeated the BC Bears 35–11 in the final to capture the tournament's first title.

Second and third editions
In 2010, the tournament was cut from 6 to 4 teams, scrapping the Canadian Division part of the tournament to create a solely international based tournament for development sides. The USA Select XV and Argentina Jaguars were joined by the second team from Tonga, and a Canada Selects side made up of the top players in the 2010 CRC season. Each team played each other once in a round-robin format, gaining 4 points for a win, with the team on the most points at the end winning the title.

The tournament returned in 2012, having not taken place in 2011 due to the 2011 Rugby World Cup. The tournament kept the same format as 2010, however the national side of Uruguay joined the tournament replacing Tonga A, though in 2014, Uruguay sent their second team Charrúas XV. Argentina Jaguars went on to win every tournament between 2012 and 2014.

Current conception
The tournament was not held in 2015 because of the 2015 Rugby World Cup. In 2016, the tournament was relaunched and expanded to six teams with the inclusion of Brazil and Chile. Unlike the previous single-site tournament featuring lesser sides, the new tournament will be held in February and March, concurrently with the European Six Nations Championship. Like the European championship, teams will play both home and away, whereas players from European clubs will be available.

Americas Rugby Challenge

A second competition, the Americas Rugby Challenge or ARCh was confirmed in August 2018, to be played in August and September. The inaugural competition took place at the Estadio Cincuentenario in Medellín, Colombia from August 24 to September 01.

The new competition brought together Rugby Americas North (RAN) and Sudamérica Rugby, following the example of the Americas Rugby Championship,  The Americas Rugby Challenge is officially the ‘B’ competition for the ARC.

As with the Americas Rugby Championship, the new Americas Rugby Challenge saw all competing countries playing against each other. The first edition of the competition was a Four Nations tournament with Rugby Americas North and Sudamérica Rugby both having two representatives each. 

The host nation of Colombia were joined by Sudamérica Rugby rivals Paraguay. Guyana and Mexico represented Rugby Americas North.

Format
Played annually, the format of the Championship is simple: each team plays every other team once in a round-robin format, making for a total of 15 matches played across the tournament. For each win, a team picks up 4 points and 2 for a draw. The team with the most points at the end wins the title. Unlike previous ARC, overseas based players are available for selection, while Argentina will mainly only select provincial and domestic players that are not part of their Super Rugby Jaguares side.

Teams

Current teams

Past teams
 BC Bears: 2009
 Ontario Blues: 2009
 Prairie Wolf Pack: 2009
 The Rock: 2009
: 2010
: 2009–2014
 2009–2014
: 2009–2014

Previous winners

Updated to after the 2019 edition

Past results

All-time results table

Updated to after 2019 Americas Rugby Championship

Results by nation

Updated to after 2019 Americas Rugby Championship

References

External links

 Official website 
 Americas Rugby News
 Americas Rugby Championship 2016 winner 

 
Rugby union competitions for national teams
Rugby union competitions in North America
Rugby union competitions in South America
2009 establishments in North America
2009 establishments in South America
Recurring sporting events established in 2009